Apache Creek Wilderness is a 5,666-acre (2,293 ha) wilderness area under the jurisdiction of the Chino Valley District of the Prescott National Forest in the U.S. state of Arizona.  Established in 1984, the Wilderness contains rolling hills of juniper and pinyon pine, outcroppings of granite, three natural springs, and several important riparian areas including Apache Creek.  Elevations range from 5,280 feet (1,609 m) to 6,970 feet (2,124 m), and the area provides excellent habitat for mountain lion and numerous bird species.

The wilderness is located in the southeast half of the Santa Maria Mountains; the Juniper Mesa Wilderness is located just north on Juniper Mesa, in the southeast Juniper Mountains, and across North Fork Creek.

See also
 List of Arizona Wilderness Areas
 List of U.S. Wilderness Areas

References

External links
 Apache Creek Wilderness – Prescott National Forest

IUCN Category Ib
Wilderness areas of Arizona
Prescott National Forest
Protected areas of Yavapai County, Arizona
Protected areas established in 1984
1984 establishments in Arizona